Sarah Dunant (born 8 August 1950) is a British novelist, journalist, broadcaster, and critic. She is married with two daughters, and lives in London and Florence.

Early life
Dunant was born in 1950 and raised in London. She is the daughter of David Dunant, a former Welsh airline steward who later became a manager at British Airways, and his French wife Estelle, who grew up in Bangalore, India.

She went to Godolphin and Latymer, a local girls' grammar school. She then studied history at Newnham College, Cambridge, where she was involved in the amateur theatrical club Footlights. After she graduated, she earned an actor's equity card and moved to Tokyo, Japan. In Tokyo, she worked as an English teacher and nightclub hostess for six months, before returning home through Southeast Asia.

Broadcasting career
She worked at BBC Radio 4 for two years in London, producing its then arts magazine Kaleidoscope, before travelling again, this time overland through North, Central and South America, a trip that became research material for her first solo novel Snow Storms in Hot Climate (1988), a thriller about the early cocaine trade in Colombia.

She went on to work extensively in radio and television, most notably as a presenter of BBC2's late night live arts programme, The Late Show in the 1990s and Night Waves, BBC Radio 3's nightly cultural discussion programme.

She contributes regularly to radio, and is an occasional presenter for BBC Radio 4's opinion slot "Point of View".

Writing
Dunant started writing in her late twenties, first with a friend, with whom she produced two political thrillers and a five-part BBC1 drama series - Thin Air, starring Kate Hardie, Nicky Henson and Clive Merrison, broadcast in 1988 - before going solo.

Her eleven subsequent novels have explored two genres: contemporary thrillers and historical fiction. What unites the two is her decision to use avowedly popular forms, characterised by compelling storytelling, as a way to explore serious subject matter and reach large audiences. This has included (though not exclusively) a passionate commitment to feminism and the role of women inside history.

In the 1990s, she wrote a trilogy around a British female private eye Hannah Wolfe, spotlighting issues like surrogacy, cosmetic surgery, animal rights, and violence to women. Sexual violence was also at the centre of Transgressions (based on a mysterious series of incidents happening in her house which tackled what might happen if a woman woke to an intruder in her house and live to tell the tale. The resulting furore over the actions of the heroine "caused the book to become a cause celebre which triggered a debate about rape and popular culture".

In 2000, an extended visit to Florence changed her working life. In what she acknowledged was something of a midlife crisis, her old passion for history was reignited, and she started to research the impact of the Renaissance on the city in the 1490s. The result was The Birth of Venus, the first of a trilogy of novels about women's lives in the Italian Renaissance. The commercial success of these books in America and elsewhere allowed Dunant to devote herself full time to writing and research, concentrating on the most current work being done in Renaissance studies, most particularly concerning the lives of women. The novel Sacred Hearts, a story of nuns in an enclosed convent in 16th century Ferrara, led to collaboration with the early music group, Musica Secreta: a theatrical adaptation using the music of the period and with a choir, performed in churches and at early music festivals around Britain.

Since then, she has been working on the history of the Borgia family, seeking to separate the colorful historical truth from the smear and gossip that built up during their lives, and in history after their deaths. It has made her a passionate advocate for better historical accuracy in popular TV series like The Borgias.

As a journalist she has reviewed for many UK newspapers, edited two books of essays on political correctness and millennial anxieties, and currently reviews for the New York Times.

Awards/citations
Her crime novels were three times shortlisted for the CWA Golden dagger award, and in 1994 she won a silver dagger for Fatlands.

In 2010 Sacred Hearts was shortlisted for the first Walter Scott Historical Fiction Prize, an award which highlighted the growing power and popularity of the form.

She is an accredited lecturer for NADFAS the UK arts charity, which promotes education and appreciation of fine arts.

In 2016, she was awarded an honorary doctorate of letters from Oxford Brookes University, where she is a guest lecturer on the Creative writing M.A. course.

Views
In her journalism and public speaking, she is a feminist, and an advocate for legalisation of marijuana. A Catholic by birth, she has also written about the importance of religion in history and the need for Catholicism to reform itself.

Bibliography

Mystery

Marla Masterson (co-written with Peter Busby as Peter Dunant)
 Exterminating Angels, 1983. London, David & Charles.  
 Intensive Care, 1986. London, Andre Deutsch.

Hannah Wolfe
 Birth Marks, 1992. New York, Doubleday. 
 Fatlands, 1993. New York, Penzler Books. 
 Under My Skin, 1995. New York, Scribner Book Co.

Standalone
 Snow Storms in a Hot Climate, 1988. New York, Random House. 
 Transgressions, 1997. New York, HarperCollins. 
 Mapping the Edge, 1999. New York, Random House.

Historical Novels of the Italian Renaissance

The Borgias
 Blood and Beauty, 2013. London, Virago Press. 
 In the Name of the Family, 2017. London, Virago Press.

Standalone
 The Birth of Venus, 2003. New York, Random House.
 In the Company of the Courtesan, 2006. London, Virago Press. 
 Sacred Hearts, 2009. New York, Random House.

Non-Fiction
 The War of the Words: The Political Correctness Debate, 1995. London, Virago Press.
 The Age of Anxiety, 1996. London, Virago Press. (with Roy Porter)

Awards
 1993 Silver Dagger Award, for Crime Fiction, winner, Fatlands
 2010 Walter Scott Prize, for historical fiction, shortlist, Sacred Hearts

References

External links
 
 Transcript of interview with Ramona Koval, The Book Show, ABC Radio National, 15 April 2007
 
 Sarah Dunant interview from Open2.net
 Listen to an audio slideshow interview with Sarah Dunant talking about Sacred Hearts on The Interview Online
 "Sarah is a Fellow on the MA in Creative Writing at Oxford Brookes University"

1950 births
Living people
Alumni of Newnham College, Cambridge
English women novelists
English historical novelists
English thriller writers
English crime fiction writers
English people of Welsh descent
People educated at Godolphin and Latymer School
20th-century English novelists
21st-century British novelists
20th-century English women writers
21st-century English women writers
Women mystery writers
Women thriller writers
Women historical novelists